Pithecops corvus, the forest Quaker, is a butterfly in the family Lycaenidae. It was described by Hans Fruhstorfer in 1919. It is found in the Indomalayan realm.

The larvae feed on Desmodium, Gardenia and Glycosmis species, including Desmodium lapurnifolium and Desmodium gardneri.

Subspecies
Pithecops corvus corvus (Sumatra, Peninsular Malaysia, Nias, Borneo)
Pithecops corvus corax Fruhstorfer, 1919 (Java to the Philippines)
Pithecops corvus ryukyeuensis Shirôzu, 1964 (Japan: Ryukyus)
Pithecops corvus correctus Cowan, 1965 (Naga Hills)
Pithecops corvus cornix Cowan, 1965 (Hainan)

References

External links
Pithecops at Markku Savela's Lepidoptera and Some Other Life Forms

Pithecops
Butterflies described in 1919